Taedia is a genus of plant bugs in the family Miridae. There are more than 80 described species in Taedia.

Species
These 87 species belong to the genus Taedia:

 Taedia adusta (McAtee, 1917)
 Taedia albicans Reuter, 1907
 Taedia albifacies (Knight, 1930)
 Taedia angrensis Carvalho, 1975
 Taedia bahiana Carvalho, 1975
 Taedia bananalensis Carvalho & Costa, 1993
 Taedia batesi Carvalho, 1980
 Taedia benfica Carvalho & Costa, 1993
 Taedia bilutea Carvalho, Costa & Cherot, 2000
 Taedia breviata (Knight, 1926)
 Taedia cajabiana Carvalho, 1976
 Taedia casta (McAtee, 1917)
 Taedia celtidis (Knight, 1930)
 Taedia chapadensis Carvalho & Costa, 1993
 Taedia clarensis Carvalho & Costa, 1993
 Taedia coimbrai Carvalho, 1975
 Taedia colon (Say, 1832)
 Taedia compacta Carvalho & Gomes, 1971
 Taedia compactina Carvalho, 1975
 Taedia compactoides Carvalho, 1975
 Taedia cylapoides Carvalho & Gomes, 1971
 Taedia deletica (Reuter, 1909)
 Taedia diamantina Carvalho, 1984
 Taedia dispersa Carvalho & Costa, 1993
 Taedia distantina Carvalho, 1954
 Taedia elongata Carvalho & Gomes, 1971
 Taedia evonymi (Knight, 1930)
 Taedia externa (Herrich-schaeffer, 1845)
 Taedia fasciola (Knight, 1930)
 Taedia fernandopolina Carvalho & Costa, 1993
 Taedia fistulosus (Distant, 1883)
 Taedia floridana (Knight, 1926)
 Taedia gleditsiae (Knight, 1926)
 Taedia goiana Carvalho & Costa, 1992
 Taedia guimarana Carvalho & Costa, 1993
 Taedia guttulosa (Reuter, 1907)
 Taedia hawleyi (Knight, 1917) (hop plant bug)
 Taedia heidemanni (Reuter, 1909)
 Taedia incaica Carvalho & Gomes, 1971
 Taedia johnstoni (Knight, 1930)
 Taedia juina Carvalho & Costa, 1993
 Taedia jurgiosa (Stål, 1862)
 Taedia koluenia Carvalho & Costa, 1993
 Taedia lenticulosa (Stål, 1860)
 Taedia leprosa (Walker, 1873)
 Taedia limba (McAtee, 1917)
 Taedia maculosa (Knight, 1930)
 Taedia manauara Carvalho, 1983
 Taedia maraba Carvalho & Costa, 1993
 Taedia marmorata (Uhler, 1894)
 Taedia mexicana Carvalho, 1975
 Taedia missionera Carvalho, 1975
 Taedia mollicula (Distant, 1884)
 Taedia multicolor Carvalho, 1975
 Taedia multisignata (Reuter, 1909)
 Taedia nicholi (Knight, 1926)
 Taedia nobilitata (Stål, 1860)
 Taedia pacifica Carvalho & Gomes, 1971
 Taedia pallidula (McAtee, 1917)
 Taedia paraguaiana Carvalho & Costa, 1991
 Taedia parenthesis (Knight, 1930)
 Taedia pauwelsi Carvalho, Costa & Cherot, 2000
 Taedia pernobilis (Reuter, 1907)
 Taedia pirapora Carvalho & Costa, 1993
 Taedia rondonia Carvalho, 1983
 Taedia salicis (Knight, 1926)
 Taedia schaffneri Carvalho, 1975
 Taedia scrupea (Say, 1832)
 Taedia scutellata Carvalho & Wallerstein, 1978
 Taedia semilota (Stål, 1860)
 Taedia severini (Knight, 1926)
 Taedia signata Carvalho & Gomes, 1971
 Taedia similaris Carvalho & Gomes, 1971
 Taedia sinopea Carvalho & Costa, 1993
 Taedia stigmosa (Berg, 1878)
 Taedia striolata (Bergroth, 1898)
 Taedia sulina Carvalho, 1954
 Taedia tehuacana Carvalho, 1975
 Taedia teutoniana Carvalho & Costa, 1993
 Taedia tibiannulata Carvalho, 1975
 Taedia tijucana Carvalho & Costa, 1993
 Taedia trivitta (Knight, 1930)
 Taedia trivittatus (Reuter, 1913)
 Taedia tucuruiensis Carvalho, 1981
 Taedia vilhena Carvalho & Costa, 1993
 Taedia virgulata (Knight, 1930)
 Taedia xinguana Carvalho, 1975

References

Further reading

External links

 

 
Miridae genera
Articles created by Qbugbot
Mirini